Miran may refer to:

Places
Miran (Xinjiang), an ancient oasis town in Ruoqiang County, Bayingolin Mongol Autonomous Prefecture, southeastern Xinjiang, western China
Miran fort, a ruined defensive structure built by the Tibetan Empire, located in Ruoqiang County, Bayingolin Mongol Autonomous Prefecture, southeastern Xinjiang, western China
Miran International Hotel, Tashkent, Uzbekistan
Miran, Khyber Pakhtunkhwa, Pakistan
Miran, Afghanistan, a town in Maidan Wardak Province, Afghanistan
Miran, Markazi, Iran
Miran, Sistan and Baluchestan, Iran
Miran, Haryana, India, see List of villages in Bhiwani district#Tosham tehsil

People
Miran (tribe), a Kurdish tribe

Given name
Miran Shah (1366–1408), governor in the turkish-mongolian Timurid Empire. 
Miran Karagheusian (1874–1948), Armenian carpet businessman, co-founder of A & M Karagheusian
Miran Jarc (1900–1942), Slovene writer
Miran Bakhsh (1907–1991), Pakistani cricketer
Miran Ogrin (1914–1985), Slovene journalist
Miran Edgar Thompson (1907–1991), American man executed after attempting to escape from Alcatraz Federal Penitentiary
Miran Krmelj (1941–2009), Yugoslav ice hockey defender
Miran Hrovatin (1949–1994), Italian photographer
Miran Hladnik (born 1954), Slovenian literary historian
Miran Božovič (born 1957), Slovenian philosopher
Miran Srebrnič (born 1970), Slovenian football defender
Miran Ravter (born 1972), Slovenian alpine skier
Miran Vodovnik (born 1977), Slovenian shot putter
Miran Tepeš (born 1979), Slovenian ski jumper
Miran Burgić (born 1984), Slovenian footballer
Miran Khesro (born 1989), Iraqi Kurdistan footballer
Miran Kabe (born 1992), Japanese footballer
, Japanese shogi player
Miran Özbey, Turkish footballer
Cem Miran Ates, Turkish footballer
Miran Deniz Çelik, Turkish actor

Nickname
Mir Sadiq Ali Khan, son of first Nawab of Bengal Mir Jafar (c. 1691–1765)
Richard Garcia Miranda (born 1975), Brazilian footballer

Surname
Mahmoud Miran (born 1974), Iranian judo practitioner

See also

Mi-ran, Korean feminine given name